The World Group Play-offs were the main play-offs of 2008 Davis Cup. Winners advanced to the World Group, and loser were relegated in the Zonal Regions I.

Teams
Bold indicates team has qualified for the 2009 Davis Cup World Group.

 From World Group

 From Americas Group I

 From Asia/Oceania Group I

 From Europe/Africa Group I

Results

Seeded teams
 
 
 
 
 
 
 
 

Unseeded teams

 
 
 
 
 
  
 
 

Playoff results

Chile vs. Australia

Great Britain vs. Austria

Switzerland vs. Belgium

Croatia vs. Brazil

Israel vs. Peru

Netherlands vs. South Korea

Romania vs. India

Slovakia vs. Serbia

References

World Group Play-offs